The A.M. Bohnert Rice Plantation Pump, located on Route 165 and Post Bayou Lane, near Gillett, Arkansas, in Arkansas County, is a rare surviving example of an early 20th-century pump engine built by the engine manufacturer Fairbanks, Morse & Company. The pumping engine played an important role in productive rice farming in the area, supplying water to flood the fields.

The National Register of Historic Places included the pump in 2010.

See also
 Tichnor Rice Dryer and Storage Building, also in Arkansas County, Arkansas
 National Register of Historic Places listings in Arkansas County, Arkansas

References

Agriculture in Arkansas
Pumps
Rice production in the United States
Agricultural buildings and structures on the National Register of Historic Places in Arkansas
National Register of Historic Places in Arkansas County, Arkansas
Fairbanks-Morse